Euphrytus is a genus of leaf beetles in the subfamily Eumolpinae. There are 29 described species in Euphrytus from Central and North America, three of which are found north of Mexico.

Species
These species belong to the genus Euphrytus:

 Euphrytus aeneus Jacoby, 1881
 Euphrytus apicicornis Jacoby, 1890
 Euphrytus costatus (Jacoby, 1890)
 Euphrytus crassipes Bechyné, 1957
 Euphrytus elongatus Jacoby, 1890
 Euphrytus fulvicollis Jacoby, 1881
 Euphrytus fulvicornis Jacoby, 1890
 Euphrytus fulvipes (Jacoby, 1881)
 Euphrytus ghilianii Bechyné, 1957
 Euphrytus huehuetenangensis Bechyné, 1953
 Euphrytus humeralis Jacoby, 1890
 Euphrytus intermedius Jacoby, 1890 i c g b
 Euphrytus micans Bechyné, 1957
 Euphrytus montivagus Bechyné, 1953
 Euphrytus nigritarsis Jacoby, 1890
 Euphrytus omisus Bechyné, 1954
 Euphrytus opacicollis Jacoby, 1881
 Euphrytus pallidus Jacoby, 1890
 Euphrytus pallipes Jacoby, 1890
 Euphrytus parvicollis Schaeffer, 1933 i c g b
 Euphrytus rugipennis (Jacoby, 1881)
 Euphrytus rugosus Jacoby, 1890
 Euphrytus semirugosus Jacoby, 1890
 Euphrytus simplex Jacoby, 1881
 Euphrytus snowi Schaeffer, 1933 b
 Euphrytus surrubrensis Bechyné, 1957
 Euphrytus tenuipes Bechyné, 1957
 Euphrytus umbrosus Jacoby, 1890
 Euphrytus varicornis Jacoby, 1890

Data sources: i = ITIS, c = Catalogue of Life, g = GBIF, b = Bugguide.net

Synonyms:
 Euphrytus varipennis Jacoby, 1890: synonym of Therses nigricollis Jacoby, 1890

References

Further reading

 
 

Eumolpinae
Chrysomelidae genera
Articles created by Qbugbot
Beetles of Central America
Beetles of North America
Taxa named by Martin Jacoby